In computational number theory, a factor base is a small set of prime numbers commonly used as a mathematical tool in algorithms involving extensive sieving for potential factors of a given integer.

Usage in factoring algorithms
A factor base is a relatively small set of distinct prime numbers P, sometimes together with -1. Say we want to factorize an integer n.

In practice, several integers x are found such that  has all of its prime factors in the pre-chosen factor base. We represent each  expression as a vector of a matrix with integer entries being the exponents of factors in the factor base. Linear combinations of the rows corresponds to multiplication of these expressions. A linear dependence relation mod 2 among the rows leads to a desired congruence . This essentially reformulates the problem into a system of linear equations, which can be solved using numerous methods such as Gaussian elimination; in practice advanced methods like the block Lanczos algorithm are used, that take advantage of certain properties of the system.

This congruence may generate the trivial ; in this case we try to find another suitable congruence. If repeated attempts to factor fail we can try again using a different factor base.

Algorithms
Factor bases are used in, for example, Dixon's factorization, the quadratic sieve, and the number field sieve. The difference between these algorithms is essentially the methods used to generate (x, y) candidates. Factor bases are also used in the Index calculus algorithm for computing discrete logarithms.

References

Integer factorization algorithms